Freddy André Horion (born 21 September 1947) aka de Zonnebril is a Belgian convicted murderer. Along with Roland Feneulle (9 September 1953-22 October 2013), he was convicted in 1980 of the murder of the Steyaert family on 23 June 1979.

Crime 
On June 23, 1979, Horion and Feneulle raided the home of car dealer Roland Steyaert in Sint-Amandsberg. Roland Steyaert was murdered in his garage, followed by the rest of the family: wife Leona Van Lancker, their 13-year-old daughter Hilde, as well as 22-year-old daughter Anne-Marie and her 24-year-old fiancé Marc De Croock, who came home unsuspectingly.

Conviction and imprisonment 
The police discovered a connection with an earlier murder case: the one on Hélène Lichachevski, a Polish shopkeeper in the port of Ghent who was killed on 9 February 1979 with the same weapon. Two days after the murder of the Steyaert family, Feneulle was arrested, and Horion was arrested the following day.

Horion, defended by the young Jef Vermassen, and Feneulle were found guilty of sixfold murder in 1980 by the East Flemish court of assizes and sentenced to death, which was immediately converted into life imprisonment, in which Horion is still serving. After being locked up in the prison of Leuven Central and Bruges for decades, Horion was transferred to the Hasselt Prison in November 2009 at the request of his lawyer. At a time when a multitude of escapes were occurring at Belgian prisons, Horion was banned from walking to the open-air courtyard. Horion managed to escape in October 1982. After being in hiding in the Netherlands for a month and a half, Horion was arrested again.

Feneulle was imprisoned in the prison of Bruges and died there at the age of 60. Horion would now deny the murder of the East Flemish shopkeeper Lichachevski for which he was convicted, and put the blame on a friend. He claims this in a series of letters.

References

1947 births
Belgian people convicted of murder
Belgian prisoners sentenced to life imprisonment
Belgian mass murderers
Belgian serial killers
Family murders
Living people
Male serial killers
People from Ghent
Prisoners sentenced to life imprisonment by Belgium